The 2014 Amber Valley Borough Council election took place on 22 May 2014 to elect members of Amber Valley Borough Council in England. This was on the same day as other local elections.

Results
One third of the council was up for election.

Alfreton

Belper East

Belper South

Codnor and Waingroves

Duffield

Heage and Ambergate

Heanor and Loscoe

Heanor East

Heanor West

Ironville and Riddings

Kilburn, Denby and Holbrook

Langley Mill and Aldercar

Ripley

Shipley Park, Horsley and Horsley Woodhouse

Somercotes

Swanwick

(Election had been delayed until Thursday 26 June 2014)

References

2014 English local elections
2014
2010s in Derbyshire